WDKC (101.5 FM, "KC101 Hometown Country") is a radio station broadcasting a country music format. Licensed to Covington, Pennsylvania, United States, the station is currently owned by Mid-Atlantic Broadcasting, Inc.

References

External links
 

Country radio stations in the United States
DKC
Tioga County, Pennsylvania
Radio stations established in 1991